George W. "Billy" Harris (birth registered during second ¼ 1951) is an English former professional rugby league footballer who played in the 1970s and 1980s.

Playing career

Challenge Cup Final appearances
Billy Harris  played right-, i.e. number 10, in Featherstone Rovers' 9-24 defeat by Warrington in the 1974 Challenge Cup Final during the 1973–74 season at Wembley Stadium, London on Saturday 11 May 1974, in front of a crowd of 77,400.

Club career
Billy Harris made his début for Featherstone Rovers on Sunday 3 September 1972, he appears to have scored no drop-goals (or field-goals as they are currently known in Australasia), but prior to the 1974–75 season all goals, whether; conversions, penalties, or drop-goals, scored 2-points, consequently prior to this date drop-goals were often not explicitly documented, therefore '0' drop-goals may indicate drop-goals not recorded, rather than no drop-goals scored.

Genealogical information
Billy Harris is the younger brother of the rugby league footballer; Graham Harris.

References

External links
Statistics at orl-heritagetrust.org.uk

1951 births
Living people
English rugby league players
Featherstone Rovers players
Oldham R.L.F.C. players
Rugby league players from Pontefract
Rugby league props
Wakefield Trinity players